is a Japanese footballer who plays as a forward for  club Urawa Red Diamonds. He played for Japan national team.

Club career
In 2023, Koroki return to Urawa Red Diamonds after Hokkaido Consadole Sapporo expiration contract in 2022 season.

International career
Koroki made his Japan national team debut on 9 October 2008 in a friendly match against United Arab Emirates.

In August 2016, Koroki was selected Japan U-23 national team as overage player for 2016 Summer Olympics. At this tournament, he played all 3 matches and scored a goal against Nigeria.

Career statistics

Club
.

1Includes Japanese Super Cup, J.League Championship and Suruga Bank Championship and Club World Cup

National team

Appearances in major competitions

Honours
Kashima Antlers
J1 League: 2007, 2008, 2009
Emperor's Cup: 2007, 2010
J.League Cup: 2011
Japanese Super Cup: 2009, 2010
Suruga Bank Championship: 2012

Urawa Red Diamonds
Emperor's Cup: 2018
J.League Cup: 2016
AFC Champions League: 2017; runner-up: 2019
Suruga Bank Championship: 2017

Individual
J.League Best XI: 2017

References

External links

 
 
 

1986 births
Living people
Association football people from Miyazaki Prefecture
Japanese footballers
Japan international footballers
J1 League players
Kashima Antlers players
Urawa Red Diamonds players
Hokkaido Consadole Sapporo players
Footballers at the 2016 Summer Olympics
Olympic footballers of Japan
Association football forwards
People from Miyazaki (city)